Niantic Township is located in Macon County, Illinois. As of the 2010 census, its population was 842 and it contained 351 housing units.

Cities and towns 
 Niantic

Adjacent townships 
 Lake Fork Township, Logan County (northwest and north)
 Illini Township (northeast and east)
 Harristown Township (east)
 Blue Mound Township (southeast)
 Mosquito Township, Christian County (south and southwest)
 Illiopolis Township, Sangamon County (west)

Geography

Demographics

References

External links
US Census
City-data.com
Illinois State Archives

Townships in Macon County, Illinois
Townships in Illinois